Dębiny  is a village in the administrative district of Gmina Abramów, within Lubartów County, Lublin Voivodeship, in eastern Poland.

In 2005 the village had a population of 365.

References

Villages in Lubartów County